The 1966 World Figure Skating Championships were held in Davos, Switzerland from February 22 to 27. At the event, sanctioned by the International Skating Union, medals were awarded in men's singles, ladies' singles, pair skating, and ice dance.

Results

Men

Judges:
 John R. Shoemaker 
 Oskar Madl 
 Néri Valdes 
 S. Francis 
 K. Minami 
 Eugen Romminger 
 Rolf Steinmann 
 Sergei Vasiliev 
 Zoltán Balázs

Ladies

Judges:
 Yvonne S. McGowan 
 Joan McLagan 
 Walter Malek 
 V. Siegmund 
 Kinuko Ueno 
 Gérard Rodrigues-Henriques 
 János Zsigmondi 
 Geoffry Yates 
 Milan Duchón

Pairs

Judges:
 Tatiana Tolmacheva 
 Yvonne S. McGowan 
 Rolf Steinmann 
 W Kahle 
 Walburga Grimm 
 Hans Meixner 
 S. Francis 
 Klára Kozári 
 Zdeněk Fikar

Ice dance

Judges:
 Pamela Davis 
 John R. Shoemaker 
 Milan Duchón 
 Dorothy Leamen 
 Lysiane Lauret 
 Klára Kozári 
 Hans Kutschera

Sources
 Figure Skating: World Champions
 Result list provided by the ISU

World Figure Skating Championships
World Figure Skating Championships
1966 World Figure Skating Championships
International figure skating competitions hosted by Switzerland
Sport in Davos
1966 in Swiss sport
February 1966 sports events in Europe